Waverton railway station is a heritage-listed railway station located on the North Shore line, serving the Sydney suburb of Waverton in New South Wales, Australia. It is served by Sydney Trains T1 North Shore line services. The station is located on Bay Road, Waverton, in the North Sydney Council local government area of New South Wales, Australia. It was designed and built by New South Wales Department of Railways. It is also known as Waverton Railway Station group. The station was added to the New South Wales State Heritage Register on 2 April 1999.

History
Present day Waverton Railway Station is located on the North Shore line, between Wollstonecraft and North Sydney railway stations.

In 1887, tenders were called for construction of a branch line extending south from Hornsby to the North Shore. The 16.8 km section between Hornsby and St Leonards was opened on 1 January 1890. Stations provided at the opening of the line included Chatswood and St Leonards. A single line was constructed at the time. The line between St Leonards and Milsons Point (the terminus at the edge of the harbour) was completed 1 May 1893.

Waverton Railway Station was opened on 1 May 1895. At the time, the station was named "Bay Road" but on 20 May 1929, "Bay Road" was renamed "Waverton" - the name it carries today.

The area was scarcely settled in 1893, but a committee of inquiry found that the route for the line recommended was the best to give a good grade for the railway to the harbourside, hence the route opening up new areas for settlement. The line between St Leonards and Milsons Point (the terminus) was built as double track and both Wollstonecraft and Waverton stations were built to suit the duplicated track from the outset.

At the time of opening, Waverton railway station consisted of two side platforms (for Up and Down North Shore lines), with a small timber station building on each of the platforms. Bay Road tunnel (and Lavender Bay tunnel) were both built during construction of the line between St Leonards and Milsons Point and opened for service as double track tunnels in 1893. After leaving the previous station (Wollstonecraft), the North Shore line passes through a series of curves before passing through the relatively short Bay Road tunnel ('S' curve within the tunnel), then a rock cutting before entering Waverton station. The rock cutting is spanned by a bridge carrying a local road (Bay Road). The Booking Office for Waverton Railway Station was built on the overhead bridge with steps leading down to each of the platforms at the time of opening. After Waverton, the line then proceeded to the original Milsons Point station at Lavender Bay.

Electrification of the North Shore line was opened in 1927, with full electric services in 1928. Automatic signalling followed and most signal boxes on the line were closed. The signalling in the vicinity of Waverton was then controlled by North Sydney signal box.

With the opening of the Sydney Harbour Bridge in 1932 and construction of new stations at North Sydney and Milsons Point on a much higher level (to suit the bridge arrangements), the trackwork at Waverton was substantially altered. The original line which was laid down the grade, through the Lavender Bay tunnel to the original Milsons Point station at Lavender Bay became a branch line. The original terminus sidings at Milsons Point was then re-used as off peak storage sidings for the suburban electric cars, and is still in use today. To suit this new arrangement and allow electric car sets to either re-enter service after storage at the sidings, or for car sets to proceed to the sidings, a new dead-end siding was laid in behind the existing Down main platform at Waverton, but at a slightly higher level. Trains from the storage sidings would proceed into the dead-end, reverse and proceed through points toward North Sydney, whereas trains coming out of service would enter the dead-end siding from North Sydney, reverse and proceed down to Lavender Bay. This arrangement is still in use today.

The 1895-built overhead Booking Office was replaced in 1993, with the design of the original structure and original features such as steps being repeated in the new building.

The station received unusual attention in January 2007, when part of the Platform 2 face was seen to have an apparition of Jesus Christ on it. Church leaders are unconvinced but remaining open-minded about the apparition, which has been explained as a combination of worn away paint and moss. People visited the station to see the apparition, requiring station staff to ensure that no observer is hit by a passing train.

Platforms and services

Transport links
Busways operate one route via Waverton station:
265: Lane Cove to North Sydney

Waverton station is served by one NightRide route:
N90: Hornsby station to Town Hall station

Description

Buildings
Overhead Booking Office - 1993 replica of 1893 building

Context
Waverton Railway Station consists of two platforms, platform shelters, new stairs and lifts, and an overhead booking office.

Overhead booking office (1993)
The present building was rebuilt in 1993 substantially in the form and design of the original 1893 structure. The building fronts Bay Rd and spans across both railway tracks and is a single storey weatherboard building with corrugated-iron gabled roof with timber finials and gablets. The streetside verandah is supported on timber posts with decorative cast iron valance.

Condition 

As at 10 September 2008, the station building was good.

Modifications and dates 
Waverton Booking Office remains on the bridge much as it was built in 1893. Apart from a number of shelters on the platforms, there are no other railway buildings at Waverton station. Lifts have been added to the station arrangements in recent years.

Heritage listing 

As at 8 May 2013, Waverton Railway Station Building has significance for its aesthetic contribution to the historic character of the North Shore Line as a whole. The current overhead booking office was rebuilt in 1993, substantially in the form and detail of the original 1893 structure and makes an important contribution to the streetscape and surrounding setting.

Waverton railway station was listed on the New South Wales State Heritage Register on 2 April 1999 having satisfied the following criteria.

The place is important in demonstrating the course, or pattern, of cultural or natural history in New South Wales.

The place has historical significance for its associations with the opening of the Short North Line (connecting the North Shore to the harbour) and the resulting phase of increased development in the surrounding area in the late 19th century.

The place is important in demonstrating aesthetic characteristics and/or a high degree of creative or technical achievement in New South Wales.

Waverton Railway Station has significance for its aesthetic contribution to the historic character of the North Shore Line as a whole. The current overhead booking office was rebuilt in 1993, substantially in the form and detail of the original 1893 structure and makes an important contribution to the streetscape and surrounding setting.

The place has strong or special association with a particular community or cultural group in New South Wales for social, cultural or spiritual reasons.

The place has the potential to contribute to the local community's sense of place and can provide a connection to the local community's history.

See also 

List of railway stations in Sydney

References

Attribution

External links

Waverton station details Transport for New South Wales

Easy Access railway stations in Sydney
Railway stations in Sydney
Railway stations in Australia opened in 1893
New South Wales State Heritage Register
Waverton, New South Wales
Articles incorporating text from the New South Wales State Heritage Register
North Shore railway line